Tofield  is a town in central Alberta, Canada. Beaverhill Lake is located immediately northeast of the community.

History 

Before 1865, only Aboriginal people lived in this area, the home of the Cree. Beaverhill Lake (known then as Beaver or Beaver Hills Lake) was full of fish and wildfowl. A variety of wild fruits could be eaten fresh or added to pemmican. Big game animals, including herds of bison, were available for food and clothing.

Tofield's Aboriginal legacy is evident in the names of local creeks: Maskawan, Amisk and Ketchamoot. The latter refers to Chief Ketchamoot who came from Ft. Pitt in 1860 to help the local Crees against their traditional Blackfoot enemies. Victorious, he remained in the area, and is buried on the bank of the Ketchamoot Creek.

Tofield's first school was organized in 1890 and named McKenzie School in honor of the first postmaster in the area, at the Logan post office. The Tofield Post Office was obtained in 1897, and was located at the south end of Beaverhill Lake.

The town of Tofield had its beginning in 1906 when Morton and Adams built a General Store near the Post Office at a site southeast of present-day Tofield. By the spring of 1906 other businesses, including a lumber yard, hardware store, another general store, a drug store, a blacksmith shop and a hotel, had been founded.

Very soon after that, the town moved to a site northwest of the old site and north of the present townsite when the Edmonton-based company Crafts and Lee offered free lots that were near the site of the proposed route of the Grand Trunk Pacific Railway. By fall of 1908 two blocks of businesses were filled and all residential lots were full.

Later that year the Grand Trunk Pacific Railway decided on a route south of the second townsite and the town moved again, to its present location. Tofield was proclaimed a village on September 9, 1907 and became a town just two years later in 1909.

Name origin 

Tofield is named after the pioneer medical man, Dr. J.H. Tofield, who came to the area in 1893 from England. He was born in Yorkshire and educated in Oxford as a doctor and as an engineer. Tofield arrived in Edmonton in 1882 and served as an army doctor in the Riel Rebellion. The name Tofield was first applied to the school district and in March 1898 to the post office.

Geography

Climate 
Tofield experiences a humid continental climate (Köppen climate classification Dfb).

Demographics 

In the 2016 Census of Population conducted by Statistics Canada, the Town of Tofield recorded a population of 2,081 living in 814 of its 864 total private dwellings, a  change from its 2011 population of 2,182.

Attractions 
Beaverhill Lake
Ukrainian Cultural Heritage Village

Infrastructure 

Transportation
The town is served by the Tofield Airport, operated by Town of Tofield.

Education 
C.W. Sears Elementary School provides education from Kindergarten to grade 4, Tofield School from grade 5 to 12, and Northstar Outreach School grades 10 to 12.

See also 
List of communities in Alberta
List of towns in Alberta

References

External links 

1907 establishments in Alberta
Beaver County, Alberta
Towns in Alberta